Burdale railway station was a station on the  Malton and Driffield Junction Railway in North Yorkshire, England.

History and description
Burdale station was situated just south of the  Burdale Tunnel. It opened on 19 May 1853, and served both the hamlet and large quarry in Burdale, North Yorkshire.

The station closed on 5 June 1950.

See also 
Yorkshire Wolds Railway

References

External links
 Burdale station at The Yorkshire Wolds Railway Restoration Project

Disused railway stations in North Yorkshire
Railway stations in Great Britain opened in 1853
Railway stations in Great Britain closed in 1950
Former Malton and Driffield Junction Railway stations